Arina Stanislavovna Moskalenko (born Arina Bystrov 6 February 1996) is a Russian rugby player. She played for the RGUTS-Podmoskovye club, European Champion in 2016, 2017, and 2018. She was awarded the Honored Master of Sports of Russia .

Life
In 2015, she played for the Podmoskovye club winning the Russian Cup.

She was involved in the Russian national rugby sevens team; she made her debut on 4 December 2015 in the game of the Russian national team against Australia in the 2015 World Cup final, entering the last three minutes; the team won silver medals. She was also involved in the games of the 2017–18 World Rugby Women's Sevens Series, where she won bronze medals in Dubai, and in Sydney.

References

1996 births
Living people
Russian rugby sevens players